César Antonio Talma Díaz (born 28 October 1980) is a retired Chilean footballer.

He played for Deportes Puerto Montt.

Personal life
Talma is of Mapuche descent.

References

External links
 

1980 births
Living people
People from Llanquihue Province
Chilean people of Mapuche descent
Chilean footballers
Provincial Osorno footballers
Club Deportivo Palestino footballers
Puerto Montt footballers
Deportes Iquique footballers
Santiago Wanderers footballers
Chilean Primera División players
Primera B de Chile players
Segunda División Profesional de Chile players
Association football defenders
Mapuche sportspeople
Indigenous sportspeople of the Americas